James D. Herbert (born June 20, 1962) is a psychologist, professor,  and university administrator. On July 1, 2017, he became the sixth president of the University of New England.

Early life and education 
Herbert grew up on the Gulf Coast of Texas. He earned a bachelor's degree in psychology from the University of Texas at Austin and a master's degree and doctorate in clinical psychology from the University of North Carolina at Greensboro. He completed a predoctoral fellowship at Beth Israel Medical Center in New York City.

Professional career 
Prior to becoming president of the University of New England, Herbert served as executive vice provost and inaugural dean of the Graduate College at  Drexel University. He previously served in faculty roles at Hahnemann University and the Medical College of Pennsylvania.

On February 21, 2017, the University of New England announced that Herbert had been selected to become its next president succeeding Danielle N. Ripich .

Scholarship and Affiliations 
Herbert is known for his work on quackery and pseudoscience in mental health, as well as on behavioral treatments for anxiety disorders. He has authored more than 170 scholarly works on these and other topics. His 2011 book Acceptance and Mindfulness in Cognitive Behavior Therapy was endorsed by the Dalai Lama.

Herbert is a fellow of the Institute for Science in Medicine, the Association for Contextual Behavioral Science, the Association for Behavioral and Cognitive Therapies, the Academy of Cognitive Therapy, and the Commission for Scientific Medicine and Mental Health.

References 

1962 births
Living people
University of Texas at Austin College of Liberal Arts alumni
University of North Carolina at Greensboro alumni
21st-century American psychologists
University of New England (United States) people
Heads of universities and colleges in the United States
20th-century American psychologists